Chinmaya PU College is a pre-university college in  Kolar, Karnataka, India. It is affiliated to Karnataka Pre-University Education Board. It is located at MC Layout, Vijaya Nagar.

Streams offered
The College offers courses in the below mentioned PU courses in Science and Commerce streams
1. PCMB - Physics, Chemistry, Mathematics, Biology
2. PCMC - Physics, Chemistry, Mathematics, Computer Science 
3. SEBA - Statistics, Economics, Business Studies, Accountancy

Facilities
1.	Laboratories
2.	Library
3.	Playground
4.	Canteen

References

Pre University colleges in Karnataka
Schools in Kolar district